Nedre Romerike is the lower (southern) part of the Romerike traditional district in Akershus, Norway. It consists of the municipalities Fet, Lørenskog, Nittedal, Rælingen, Skedsmo, Sørum and Aurskog-Høland. It make up the area served by Nedre Romerike District Court, based in Lillestrøm. The upper (northern) half of Romerike is known as Øvre Romerike.

References

Districts of Viken